RMS Empress of France was an ocean liner built in 1928 by John Brown at Clydebank in the United Kingdom for the Canadian Pacific Steamships and launched as SS Duchess of Bedford in 1928. She was renamed Empress of France in 1947.

Duchess of Bedford
Duchess of Bedford was one of four 20,000-gross ton Canadian Pacific liners along with sister ships Duchess of York, Duchess of Richmond, and Duchess of Atholl. The quartet were "Mini-Empresses," built to go further up the St. Lawrence River, past Quebec City, to Montreal, hoping to cater to travellers who would then travel by train to Chicago and the American Midwest – a faster journey than it would take going through New York. All were equipped with hot and cold running water in all cabins. The class were known as the "Drunken Duchesses" for their tendency to roll.

Among Duchess of Bedfords better-known passengers in 1931 was Montagu Norman, the Governor of the Bank of England, who was en route from Canada to England when he received word the United Kingdom had permanently abandoned the gold standard.

The writer Elspeth Huxley worked on her biography of Lord Delamere while crossing the Atlantic in 1933.

Troopship
At the outbreak of war in September 1939, Duchess of Bedford was commandeered by the Admiralty to bring civil and military officials from England to India.

Duchess of Bedford  was amongst the ships which evacuated Singapore in 1941. Duchess of Bedford transported 1,955 men of the 18th Infantry Division to Singapore before it fell, departing Bombay on 19 January 1942 and arriving ten days later.  Duchess of Bedford was joined by an "empress" sister ship in this convoy duty. The troopship SS Empress of Japan carried 1,981 men of the 18th Division.  The convoy departed with evacuees on 30 January.

After Allied forces successfully drove remaining German and Italian forces from North Africa, she again served, landing troops at Avola in the Invasion of Sicily, and again, with the invasion of the Italian mainland at Salerno.

Regarding her involvement in the Allied invasion of Sicily in 1943:

Empress of France
War losses reduced the Canadian Pacific fleet considerably and only the Liverpool-Montreal route was reopened post war. The two surviving Cabin class Duchesses were upgraded to "Empress" status with much reduced passenger numbers (400 1st, 300 tourist, down from the pre-war three class capacity of 1,570). On 3 March 1947, Duchess of Bedford arrived at the Govan yard of the Fairfield Shipbuilding and Engineering Company for her overhaul and refit, during the course of which (in October 1947) she was renamed Empress of France. Preliminary plans to name the ship Empress of India were laid aside when India's independence was declared in August 1947. She re-entered service from Liverpool to Montreal on 1 September 1948.

In a 1958/1959 refit, her funnel tops were streamlined and her accommodation was revised to 218 1st class and 482 tourist. The ship was taken out of service in 1960; and she was broken up at Newport in late December of the same year.

See also
 CP Ships
 List of ocean liners
 List of ships in British Columbia

Notes

References
 Haworth, R.B.   Miramar Ship Index: Empress of France, ID#1160482.
 Tate, E. Mowbray. (1986).  Transpacific Steam: The Story of Steam Navigation from the Pacific Coast of North America to the Far East and the Antipodes, 1867–1941. New York: Cornwall Books.  (cloth)

 

1928 ships
Ships built on the River Clyde
Ships of CP Ships
Steamships of Canada
Ocean liners of Canada
Troop ships of the United Kingdom
Troopships of Canada